Shaun Treeby (born 26 January 1989) is a New Zealand rugby union player.

Playing career

Provincial Rugby

Treeby came up through age group levels for Wellington and made his full provincial debut in 2009. By the 2010 ITM Cup, he was a fixture for Wellington, making 10 starts and scoring his first two provincial tries. He plays centre.

Super Rugby

Treeby signed with the Highlanders for the 2011 Super Rugby season, following his former Wellington coach Jamie Joseph south. He quickly established himself as a key member of the squad, starting each of the team's first 8 games and forming an excellent partnership with Kendrick Lynn, before suffering a knee injury. He returned from injury to start the final four matches of the season, and scored his first Super Rugby try against the Lions on 28 May.

References

External links
Highlanders Profile
http://www.sportal.co.nz/rugby-union-news-display/treebys-bulk-benefits-96569
http://www.stuff.co.nz/sport/rugby/provincial/2705865/Young-Wellington-Lion-has-huge-opportunity

1989 births
Living people
New Zealand rugby union players
Rugby union centres
Highlanders (rugby union) players
Wellington rugby union players
Rugby union players from New Plymouth